A Pukwudgie, also spelled Puk-Wudjie (another spelling, Puck-wudj-ininee, is translated by Henry Schoolcraft as "little wild man of the woods that vanishes"), is a human-like creature of Wampanoag folklore, found in  Delaware and Prince Edward Island, sometimes said to be .

In mythology
According to legend, Pukwudgies can appear and disappear at will, shapeshift (of which the most common form is a creature that looks like a porcupine from the back and a half-troll, half-human from the front and walks upright), lure people to their deaths, use magic, launch poison arrows, and create fire.

Native Americans believed that Pukwudgies were once friendly to humans, but then turned against them, and are best left alone. According to lore, a person who annoyed a Pukwudgie would be subject to nasty tricks by it, or subject to being followed by the Pukwudgie, who would cause trouble for them. They are known to kidnap people, push them off cliffs, attack their victims with short knives and spears, and to use sand to blind their victims.

Pukwudgies are said to be the enemies of culture heroes Maushop and Granny Squannit. One story from Wampanoag folklore explains that they began causing mischief and tormenting the Natives out of jealousy of the devotion and affection the Natives had for Maushop, who eventually exiled them to different parts of North America. The Pukwudgies have since been hostile to humans, and took revenge by killing Maushop's five sons. Some variations even suggest that they killed Maushop himself.

In fiction

The Song of Hiawatha
Pukwudgie are mentioned in Henry Wadsworth Longfellow's epic poem The Song of Hiawatha. After reading Schoolcraft's stories of Ojibwe folklore he featured them in the chapter "The Death of Kwasind" which begins with:
Far and wide among the nations
Spread the name and fame of Kwasind;
No man dared to strive with Kwasind,
No man could compete with Kwasind.
But the mischievous Puk-Wudjies,
They the envious Little People,
They the fairies and the pygmies,
Plotted and conspired against him.

Harry Potter
Pukwudgies have been identified by J. K. Rowling as magical creatures in the Harry Potter universe. In a description on Pottermore, Rowling describes the creatures as follows:––
The Pukwudgie is also native to America: a short, grey-faced, large-eared creature distantly related to the European goblin. Fiercely independent, tricky and not over-fond of humankind (whether magical or mundane), it possesses its own powerful magic. Pukwudgies hunt with deadly, poisonous arrows and enjoy playing tricks on humans.Pukwudgie is a symbol and a name of one of the houses in the Ilvermorny School of Witchcraft and Wizardry that is said to represent the heart of a wizard, and favor the healers.

‘’Legacies T.V. Series’’
Pugwudgies are mentioned and shown in season 4 of the show in episode 6.

References
'''

Ojibwe legendary creatures
Fairies
Legendary creatures of the indigenous peoples of North America
Mythic humanoids
Mythological tricksters
Supernatural legends